Shiga 1st district (滋賀県第1区, Shiga-ken dai-ikku or simply 滋賀1区, Shiga-ikku) is a single-member constituency of the House of Representatives, the lower house of the national Diet of Japan. It is located in Western Shiga and covers the cities of Ōtsu, the prefectural capital, and Takashima. As of 2009, 314,742 eligible voters were registered in the district.

The district's first representative for the district after its creation in the electoral reform of 1994 was Democratic Socialist Tatsuo Kawabata who had represented the five-member SNTV Shiga At-large district since 1986. After the party realignments of the 1990s, he like most former Democratic Socialists eventually joined the Democratic Party (Minshutō) of Japan where he became a leading figure in the Democratic Socialist faction, also often referred to as Kawabata group. In the landslide "postal election" of 2005, Kawabata lost Shiga 1st district to Liberal Democrat Ken'ichirō Ueno, but regained it in the 2009 general election that swept the Democrats to power. Kawabata became a minister of state in the Hatoyama, Kan and Noda cabinets; Ueno who failed re-election by proportional representation was a candidate in the 2010 Shiga gubernatorial race, but lost to centre-left supported incumbent Yukiko Kada. In the landslide Democratic defeat of 2012, Kawabata lost the district to Liberal Democratic former Shizuoka assemblyman Toshitaka Ōoka. Despite his comparatively narrow margin of defeat that gave him rank 4 on the DPJ list in Kinki, Kawabata also failed to win a proportional seat as the Democratic Party was reduced to fourth party (12.0%) in the Kinki proportional vote and only won three of 29 seats.

List of representatives

Election results

References 

Shiga Prefecture
Districts of the House of Representatives (Japan)